Riidaja Airfield (ICAO: EERD) is a private airfield in Riidaja, Valga County, Estonia.

The airfield's owner is Ants Taul.

References

Airports in Estonia
Buildings and structures in Valga County
Tõrva Parish